The North Atlantic Radio System (NARS) was a chain of 5 tropospheric scatter communication sites. It was an expansion of the former Distant Early Warning Line  (DEW Line). NARS has been built for the United States Air Force (USAF) by Western Electric (AT&T) and its sites were maintained under contract by ITT Federal Electric Corporation (now ITT Federal Services Corp.).  All NARS stations were supervised and controlled by the USAF, by agreement with the Canadian and Danish Governments.

Historical information  
In the early 1950s arctic surroundings and weather conditions of northern Canada made construction and manning of HF and VHF radio or microwave relay stations almost impossible. However, there was an urgent need of reliable data and communication facilities from the radarstations in the north to their control centers in the south.

The initial phase was using tropospheric scatter radio communication (troposcatter). Powerful radio signals in the kiloWatt range were scattered off the troposphere onwards to distant receiving stations using gigantic ‘billboard’ like antennas picking up just a fraction of the transmitted signals which had been scattered forward, meaning that the antenna and equipment maintenance and alignment had to be executed very carefully.

Construction of this system coded Polevault started in 1954, becoming ops in 1955 and becoming extended as of 1956. This troposcatter system had been supported by an undersea datacable system stretching from Thule airbase Greenland via Cape Dyer to Newfoundland Canada. The undersea cable system however appeared to be unreliable being cut many times by trawlers and icebergs so a better data transfersystem was definitely needed.

As of 1962 the new Semi Automatic Ground Environment (SAGE) system led to a gradual shut down of the Polevault system. SAGE consisted of large computers and associated networking equipment that coordinated data from many radar sites and processed it to produce a single unified image of the airspace over a wide area. SAGE directed and controlled the former North American Air Defense (NORAD) response to a Soviet air attack, operating in this role from the late 1950s into the 1980s.

Construction of the large Ballistic Missile Early Warning System (BMEWS) radars at Thule airbase and at Fylingdales (UK) and another radar chain through Greenland, Iceland and the Faroe Islands also called for new powerful troposcatter communication stations linking all radarsites to the NORAD Hq at Colorado (US). This communication chain became known as the North Atlantic Radio System (NARS).

Equipment used 
The NARS used AN/FRC-39(V) and AN/FRC-56(V) transmitting and receiving equipment, manufactured by Radio Engineering Laboratories, which could be configured for 1 kW, 10 kW or 50 kW power output depending on the range and/or quality of signal required.

NARS sites were configured for 10 kW output, with the exception of site 41 in both directions and site 42's connection to site 41. Each set consisted of 2 transmitters and 4 receivers, for redundancy and to boost signal to noise ratios, using vacuum tube technology which proved time-consuming to maintain at high levels of efficiency.  The 50kW used 120 ft antennas and the 10kW shots used 60 ft antennas. Equipment was configured for Quad diversity as follows; Polarity diversity, Space Diversity, Frequency Diversity and Combiner diversity as was typical for most Tropo-scatter communications over difficult paths.

Levels of service proved extremely variable with the effects of weather and finicky equipment frequently causing loss of connection. Improvements were gained through better maintenance procedures but did not change significantly until the introduction of solid state technology, with the system able to transmit at 9.6kbit/s, (a very fast internet connection for that time), by the time the system was closed down in 1992 after 30 years of service.

With the advent of satellite communications (SATCOM) the days of the Troposcatter networks were over, but NARS was closed down early due to the loss of the DYE-2 DEW Line station in 1988, severing the networks connection with the rest of the DEW line. Site 46 also had to close to make way for the new BMEWS Phased Array Radar at RAF Fylingdales.

NARS sites

From 1960 the troposcatter sites were built as:
 Site 41 – Keflavic Air Base Keflavik at grid 64°02′07″N 22°39′16″W in the SW of Iceland 1952–1992. The west facing antennas/building was Dye 5 and Tech Control. This shot was a 50kW shot to Dye 4 in Greenland. The east facing antennas/building shot to NARS site 42 at Hofn Iceland and was also a 50kW shot. The dividing line between the Dew Line system and the NARS system was between the two buildings. Today the site is closed, the Tropo towers are gone and all buildings have been removed.
 Site 42 – Höfn, Iceland at grid 64°14'38"N 14°57'50"W was a dual-purpose troposcatter radio comms relay site sharing its location with the USAF/NATO radar station at Hofn from 1961 – 1992 until its closure. The site was linked to Site 41 (Keflavik, Iceland) and to Site 43 at Sornfelli Tórshavn (Faroe Islands) by 235 and 292 mile shots respectively. Equipped with 2x 120 ft antennas for the Keflavik shot operating at 50 kilowatt the Sornfelli Tórshavn shot was accomplished by 2x 60 ft antennas operating at 10 kilowatt. Little known is that this site also was the entry point for the SOSUS system. When satellite communications made the troposcatter communications system obsolete, Site 42 was shut down along with the rest of the NARS system in 1988. Remaining idle through the end of manned ops at Hofn Air Station, the troposcatter antennas and support buildings have been demolished in the mid-1990s with the rest of the Air Station. The concrete blocks for the billboard antennas and feed horns still remain.
 Site 43 – Tórshavn, Faroe Islands Sornfelli Mtn at grid 62°4'1"N 6°58'0"W was a Danish installation (Island Command Faroes) and NATO early warning radar system consisting of 2 radars until closure in 2002. One of the radars is currently still operating as a civilian airtraffic control radar. This site had Tropo-scatter shots to site 44 and to site 42
 Site 44 – RAF Mormond Hill at grid 57°36'13"N 2°1'58"W in the NE of Scotland was home to several troposcatter antennas respectively operated by USAF - providing comms to and from RAF Buchan via site 46 - the British Army and British Telecom. After USAF closure the site was transferred to the MoD in 1993 and is now used for commercial British Telecom ops.
 Site 46 – RAF Fylingdales at grid 54°21'32"N 0°39'50"W station was built by the Radio Corporation of America (RCA) in 1962, and originally maintained by RCA but later was operated and maintained by ITT/FELEC. This site consisted of a 10kW shot to site 44 and a 10kW shot south that eventually interfaced with the 486L system and the rest of Europe

See also
 Radio propagation
 Microwave
 ACE High - Cold war era NATO European troposcatter network
 White Alice Communications System - Cold war era Alaskan tropospheric communications link
 List of White Alice Communications System sites
 TV-FM DX
 List of DEW Line Sites
 Distant Early Warning Line

References

External links
 Sornfelli radar
 Eyes and Ears of the arctic

Telecommunications equipment of the Cold War
Radio frequency propagation
Tropospheric scatter systems
Military radio systems